Jean-Claude Lefebvre (11 January 1933 – 14 October 2014) was a French racing cyclist. He rode in the 1959 Tour de France.

References

1933 births
2014 deaths
French male cyclists
Place of birth missing